Amores de mercado may refer to:
 Amores de mercado (2006 TV series), an American-Colombian television series
 Amores de mercado (Chilean TV series), a 2001 television series